"Blown Away" is a song by Australian pop group Bachelor Girl. The song was released in September 1999 as the fourth and final single from the group's debut studio album, Waiting for the Day (1998). The song peaked at number 79 on the ARIA Charts.

Track listing
 CD Single
 "Blown Away" - 4:33	
 "Buses and Trains"  (Italian version)  - 3:42

Charts

Release history

References

Bachelor Girl songs
1999 singles
1998 songs
Songs written by Anne Preven
Songs written by Scott Cutler